Bavagaru Bagunnara is a 1998 Indian Telugu-language romantic comedy film directed by Jayanth C. Paranjee and produced by Nagendra Babu. The film stars Chiranjeevi, Rambha and Paresh Rawal. It was dubbed and released into Tamil as Muradan.

Released on 9 April 1998, the film was a super hit at the box office. The film was remade into Hindi as Kunwara (2000) and in Bangladesh as Jamai Shashur (2003).

The film seems to be inspired by A Walk in the Clouds, a 1995 American romantic drama film directed by Alfonso Arau and starring Keanu Reeves, Aitana Sánchez-Gijón, Giancarlo Giannini, and Anthony Quinn.

Plot
Raju runs between New Zealand, where he owns a restaurant, and India, where he runs a home for orphans started in his sister's name. Swapna is a student in New Zealand, staying with her uncle. Once she goes looking for Raju to take him to task for thrashing her friend. On learning that Raju was not at fault, she promptly falls in love with him.

After that, the scene shifts to India when Raju goes there to look after the "home". There, he keeps a pregnant woman, Sandhya, from killing herself. On learning about her jilted love affair, he decides to help her out. He convinces her that he will act as her husband until the baby is born, whereupon he would leave her, so that she could live with her child peacefully as a deserted wife. With that plan, they go to her village. Her father, Rao Bahaddur Rajendra Prasad, after initially refusing, unwillingly gives his nod to the plan under pressure from family members.

The story takes a twist when Swapna comes to India and finds, to her utter shock, Raju as her brother-in-law. Raju's pleadings of innocence fail to convince her. Meanwhile, Raju gets involved in a dispute about the ownership of a lake between their village and a neighboring one. He wins the race that decides its ownership in favor of Sandhya's village. Sandhya's father, happy at the turn of events leading to heightening of the prestige of their village, decides to accept Raju as his son-in-law and decides to get them married. Now Swapna, who learns the truth, is in turmoil. Meanwhile, Sandhya makes another attempt at suicide, but Raju thwarts it again. In the process, he learns that she met her lover, who was held captive by the neighboring village head and is being forced to marry his daughter. Raju rescues Sandhya's lover and gets them married.

Cast
 Chiranjeevi as Raju
 Rambha as Swapna
 Paresh Rawal as Rao Bahadur Rajendra Prasad
 Rachana Banerjee as Sandhya
 Kota Srinivasa Rao as Pedda Basavaraju
 Satyanarayana as Rao Bahadur Visweswara Rao
 Sowcar Janaki
 Brahmanandam as Gopal
 Jaya Prakash Reddy
 Srihari as Chinna Kankaraju
 Achyuth as Venkat, Sandhya's lover
 Sudha as Bhuvaneshwari
 Deepa Raju
 M. S. Narayana as doctor
 Nagendra Babu (special appearance in the song "Sorry Sorry")

Soundtrack
The music for this film was composed by Mani Sharma. The audio was a huge hit and all the songs were chartbusters. The track "Aunty Koothura", sung by S. P. Balasubrahmanyam and K. S. Chitra was a massive hit among the masses and was an instant chartbuster for its powerful dance choreography and beautiful rendition by the singers.

Reception 
Griddaluru Gopalrao of Zamin Ryot writing his review on 24 April 1998 has called the film "a laughing riot." Goplarao appreciated the film's story and screenplay for its novelty with particular praise for Paranjee's direction, Chiranjeevi's performance, and Sharma's soundtrack. A critic from The New Indian Express noted that it was "worth watching".

Notes

External links
 

1998 films
Telugu films remade in other languages
1990s Telugu-language films
Films scored by Mani Sharma
Indian romantic comedy films
Films directed by Jayanth C. Paranjee